Svenska Mästerskapet was a Swedish football competition held as a cup to decide the Swedish Champions between 1896 and 1925. It was held during a short period, and all games were often played in either Gothenburg or Stockholm. For many years only teams from Gothenburg and Stockholm participated.

The Swedish Championship knockout competition was last played in 1925. The 1924–1925 season saw the start of the nationwide league Allsvenskan, and from the 1930–1931 season the Allsvenskan winners have been crowned Swedish Champions, except for the years 1982–1990 when Allsvenskan was followed by the Swedish Championship Playoffs and 1991 and 1992 when Allsvenskan was followed by Mästerskapsserien, both to determine the Swedish Champions.

Previous winners

Cup champions

See also
Allsvenskan
Svenska Cupen

Notes 

 
Defunct football competitions in Sweden
1896 establishments in Sweden
1925 disestablishments in Sweden
Recurring sporting events established in 1896